Lewis Thomas Drummond (May 28, 1813 – November 24, 1882) was a Quebec lawyer, judge and political figure.

He was born in Coleraine, County Londonderry, Ireland in 1813. His father, an attorney, died while he was young and he came to Lower Canada with his mother in 1825. He studied at the Séminaire de Nicolet, then studied law with Charles Dewey Day in Montreal and was called to the bar in 1836. He set up practice in Montreal and defended a number of persons involved in the Lower Canada Rebellion. Drummond, a supporter of Louis-Hippolyte Lafontaine, was elected  to the Legislative Assembly for the city of Montreal in an 1844 by-election, but was defeated in the general election that followed. However, he was elected in Portneuf. In 1848, he was named Queen's Counsel and, in the same year, was elected to represent Shefford in the assembly. Drummond was a director of the Montreal City and District Savings Bank, president of the Stanstead, Shefford and Chambly Railroad and helped found the Garden River Mining Company. He was solicitor general for Canada East from 1848 to 1851, a post that was not part of the cabinet at the time. In 1851, he became attorney general for Canada East, serving until 1856. Although he had become a seigneur by marriage, he developed legislation limiting seigneurial privileges which was later amended to abolish seigneurial tenure. He was reelected in Shefford in 1858; however, when he was forced to run in a by-election for his seat after being named attorney general, he was defeated but was then elected in Lotbinière. In 1861, he was elected in Rouville; however, when he was named to the executive council as Commissioner of Public Works, he was unable to gain reelection and was forced to resign. In 1864, he was named puisne judge in the Court of Queen's Bench. He retired due to poor health in 1873.

He died in Montreal in 1882 from chronic bronchitis.

External links

1813 births
1882 deaths
People from Coleraine, County Londonderry
Members of the Legislative Assembly of the Province of Canada from Canada East
Canadian judges
People from County Londonderry
Irish emigrants to pre-Confederation Quebec
Canadian King's Counsel
Attorneys-General of the Province of Canada
Immigrants to Lower Canada
19th-century Canadian judges
Burials at Notre Dame des Neiges Cemetery